Baptiste Gros (born 17 July 1990 in Annecy) is a French cross-country skier.

Gros competed at the 2014 Winter Olympics for France. He placed 40th in the qualifying round in the sprint, failing to advance to the knockout stages.

Gros made his World Cup debut in December 2010. As of January 2016, he has four World Cup podium finishes, three seconds and a third, all in sprint disciplines. His best World Cup overall finish is 76th, in 2013–14. His best World Cup finish in a discipline is 32nd, in the 2013-14 sprint.

Cross-country skiing results

Olympic Games

World Championships

World Cup

Season standings

Individual podiums
 1 victory – (1 ) 
 5 podiums – (4 , 1 )

Team podiums
 2 podiums – (2 )

References

1990 births
Living people
Olympic cross-country skiers of France
Cross-country skiers at the 2014 Winter Olympics
Cross-country skiers at the 2018 Winter Olympics
Sportspeople from Annecy
French male cross-country skiers
Universiade medalists in cross-country skiing
Université Savoie-Mont Blanc alumni
Universiade gold medalists for France
Universiade silver medalists for France
Competitors at the 2011 Winter Universiade
20th-century French people
21st-century French people